Bruno Lipi (born 7 April 1994) is an Albanian footballer who plays for A.O. Diagoras Vrachneikon 1960 in Greece as a midfielder.

References

External links

1994 births
Living people
Association football midfielders
Albanian footballers
KF Bylis Ballsh players
KF Laçi players
KS Turbina Cërrik players
Kallithea F.C. players
Kategoria Superiore players
Kategoria e Parë players
Albanian expatriate footballers
Expatriate footballers in Greece
Albanian expatriate sportspeople in Greece